Ian Niklas Svantesson (born August 31, 1993) is an American soccer player.

Career

College career
Svantesson played four years of college soccer at the University of Alabama at Birmingham between 2012 and 2015. While at college, Svantesson also appeared for Premier Development League side Orlando City U-23.

Professional career
Svantesson signed with North American Soccer League side Rayo OKC on February 3, 2016, for their inaugural season in 2016.

On December 12, 2017, Svantesson signed with Charleston Battery.

Personal life 
His father is the retired professional tennis player Tobias Svantesson.

References

1993 births
Living people
American soccer players
Association football forwards
Charleston Battery players
North American Soccer League players
Orlando City U-23 players
Rayo OKC players
Soccer players from Orlando, Florida
FC Tulsa players
UAB Blazers men's soccer players
USL Championship players
USL League Two players